Varpan is a lake just north of Falun in Sweden.

Lakes of Dalarna County